"The Secret Miracle" (original Spanish title: "El milagro secreto") is a short story by Argentine writer and poet Jorge Luis Borges. It was first published in the magazine Sur in February 1943 and was collected in Ficciones.

Plot
The main character of the story is a playwright named Jaromir Hladík, who is living in Prague when it is occupied by the Nazis during World War II. Hladík is arrested and charged with being Jewish as well as opposing the Anschluss, and sentenced to die by firing squad.

Although he at first experiences simple terror at the prospect of death, Hladík's main concern soon turns to his unfinished play, titled The Enemies. His previous works he feels to be unsatisfactory, and wants to complete this play, which he feels to be the one by which history will judge and vindicate him. With two acts left to write and his death sentence to be carried out in a matter of days, however, it seems impossible that he could complete it in time.

On the last night before his death, Hladík prays to God, requesting that he be granted one year in which to finish the play. That night, he dreams of going to the Clementinum library, where one of the books contains God within a single letter on one of the pages, which the old, bitter librarian has been unable to find despite looking for most of his life. Someone returns an atlas to the library; Hladík touches a letter on a map of India and hears a voice that says to him, "The time for your labor has been granted".

The next day at the appointed time, two soldiers come for Hladík, and he is taken outside and the firing squad is lined up before him. The sergeant calls out the order to fire, and time stops. The entire world freezes motionless, including Hladík himself, standing in place before the firing squad; however, although he is completely paralyzed, he remains conscious. After a time, he understands: God has granted him the time he requested. For him, a year of subjective time will pass between the sergeant's order and the soldiers firing their rifles, though no one else will realize that anything unusual has happened – hence, the "secret miracle" of the story's title.

Working from memory, Hladík mentally writes, expands and edits his play, shaping every detail and nuance to his satisfaction. Finally, after a year of labor, he completes it; only a single epithet is left to be written, which he chooses, and time begins again and the volley from the soldiers' rifles kills him.

See also
Inception
Time perception

References

Short stories by Jorge Luis Borges
1943 short stories
Fantasy short stories
Works originally published in Sur (magazine)